Bombyx incomposita is a moth in the family Bombycidae. It was described by van Eecke in 1929. It is found on Sumatra, Peninsular Malaysia and Borneo. The habitat consists of lowland rainforests.

References

Natural History Museum Lepidoptera generic names catalog

Bombycidae
Moths described in 1929